The Wabash Valley Railroad  was a shortline railroad that operated in  Kansas from 1977 to 1981. The WV used rebuilt M-K Geeps and operated a former Pennsylvania Railroad branch between Belleville, Kansas and Mahaska, Nebraska.  It gave up after state funding disappeared and another new startup, the Prairie Central Railway, also quit running the line after a few years.  It was abandoned in 1984.  

Defunct Kansas railroads
Defunct Illinois railroads